The AB-Aktion, was a second stage of the Nazi German campaign of violence during World War II aimed to eliminate the intellectuals and the upper classes of the Second Polish Republic across the territories slated for eventual annexation. Most of the killings were arranged in a form of forced disappearances from multiple cities and towns upon the German arrival. In the spring and summer of 1940, more than 30,000 Polish citizens were arrested by the Nazi authorities in German-occupied central Poland, the so-called General Government. About 7,000 of them including community leaders, professors, teachers and priests (labeled as suspected of criminal activities) were subsequently massacred secretly at various locations including at the Palmiry forest complex near Palmiry.  The others were sent to Nazi concentration camps.

History
The mass murder of Polish leaders, politicians, artists, aristocrats, the intelligentsia, and people suspected of potential anti-Nazi activity began in the fall of 1939, and was seen by Nazi Germany as a pre-emptive measure to keep the Polish resistance scattered and to prevent the Poles from revolting during the planned German invasion of France. The anti-Polish AB-Aktion was prepared by Hans Frank, the commander of the General Government. It was also discussed with Soviet officials during a series of secretive Gestapo–NKVD Conferences.

The first killings of Polish intelligentsia took place soon after the German invasion, lasting from autumn 1939 until spring 1940. It was called Operation Intelligenzaktion, a plan to eliminate Poland's intelligentsia and leadership in the western part of the country, realized by Einsatzgruppen and Volksdeutscher Selbstschutz. As the result of this operation 60,000 Polish nobles, teachers, entrepreneurs, social workers, priests, judges and political activists were killed in 10 regional actions. The Intelligenzaktion was continued by the German AB-Aktion Operation in occupied territories of central Poland. Both murder operations were conducted in part according to an "enemies of the Reich list" prepared before the war by members of the German minority in Poland and printed ahead of time by the German Intelligence as the Sonderfahndungsbuch Polen (Special Prosecution Book-Poland).

Prior to AB-Aktion, in late 1939 and early 1940, most Polish university professors, intellectuals, writers, politicians, teachers and other members of the elite of Polish society were briefly arrested by the Gestapo and had their names registered. Frank finally accepted and approved the Ausserordentliche Befriedungsaktion on 16 May 1940. In the following weeks, the German police, Gestapo, SD (Sicherheitsdienst) and units of the Wehrmacht arrested roughly 30,000 Poles in major Polish cities, including Warsaw, Łódź, Lublin and Kraków. The interned were held in a number of prisons, including the infamous Pawiak where they were subject to brutal interrogations by Nazi officials. After time spent in the prisons of Warsaw, Kraków, Radom, Kielce, Nowy Sącz, Tarnów, Lublin or Wiśnicz, the arrested Poles were transferred to Nazi concentration camps, most notably to the newly created camp of Auschwitz, as well as Sachsenhausen and Mauthausen. Approximately 3,500 members of the Polish intelligentsia were executed at the mass murder sites in Palmiry near Warsaw, Firlej, Wincentynów near Radom, and in the Bliżyn forest near Skarżysko-Kamienna.

Among those killed were Maciej Rataj, Stefan Bryła, Tadeusz Tański, Mieczysław Niedziałkowski, Janusz Kusociński and Stefan Kopec. Actions were started on a similar scale in other Polish areas annexed by Nazi Germany. According to many historians, including Norman Davies, the action against Polish leaders was coordinated with the authorities of the Soviet Union, who at the same time perpetrated the mass murder of 22,000 Polish military officers at Katyń and other places.

The active persecution of Polish intellectuals was continued until the end of the war. The direct continuation of the AB Action was a German campaign in the east started after the German invasion of the USSR. Among the most notable mass executions of Polish professors was the massacre of Lwów professors, in which approximately 45 professors of the university in Lwów were murdered together with their families and guests. Among those killed in the massacre were Tadeusz Boy-Żeleński, former Polish prime minister Kazimierz Bartel, Włodzimierz Stożek,  and Stanisław Ruziewicz. Thousands more perished in the Ponary massacre, in German concentration camps, and in ghettos.

Aftermath
The total number of victims and the specific dates of executions of members of the Polish intelligentsia can only be approximated due to their multitude. After the war, many Germans responsible for organizing the AB Action were tried before the Nuremberg Military Tribunals. However, the majority of responsible commanders vanished during and after the war, before being held legally accountable for their crimes.

See also
 Sonderaktion Krakau: a 1939 Nazi round-up professors and academics of the Jagiellonian University
 World War II atrocities in Poland
 Pacification operations in German-occupied Poland
 Operation Tannenberg
 Generalplan Ost
 Gestapo–NKVD conferences (1939-1940)
 Intelligenzaktion
 Katyn massacre
 Anti-Polonism
 History of Poland (1939–45)
 Chronicles of Terror

References

External links
 The Destruction of the Polish Elite. Operation AB – Katyn , the exhibition organized by the Institute of National Remembrance (2009).
 Collection of testimonies concerning terror against the Polish elites in 'Chronicles of Terror' testimony database

1940 in Poland
Massacres in Poland
Nazi war crimes in Poland
Persecution by Nazi Germany
Persecution of Poles
Persecution of Jews
Persecution of intellectuals